Scout24, based in Munich, is a listed digital company and operates the online marketplace ImmoScout24. The multi-platform of ImmoScout24 has more than 20 million visitors per month in Germany in 2021 on the website or in the app.

The company's shares have been listed in the MDAX since June 18, 2018.

ImmoScout24 is an online portal for real estate providers, owners, tenants and buyers. The website and app gets around 20 million visitors per month. At the end of 2019, 425,000 real estate ads were advertised on ImmoScout24.

The Berlin-based company employs around 670 people.

History 

Scout24 was founded in 1998 by the internet entrepreneur Joachim Schoss with the financing by the entrepreneur Otto Beisheim and others. In 2004, the then subsidiary of the Deutsche Telekom, T-Online, acquired Scout24 from Beisheim Holding. As a result of the merger of T-Online International with Deutsche Telekom, Scout24 became a direct subsidiary of Deutsche Telekom from June 2006.

In 2011, Telekom sold the Scout24 Group's job exchange, JobScout24, to CareerBuilder.

In mid-2013, Deutsche Telekom announced the sale of the Scout24 group. On November 21, 2013, Telekom announced that it had sold 70 percent of its shares in Scout24 to Hellman & Friedman for EUR 1.5 billion.

On September 7, 2015, Scout24 announced its IPO on the Frankfurt Stock Exchange. A total of around 29.5 million shares are to be placed at an offer volume of EUR 899 million. After the IPO, Hellman & Friedman will hold 49% and Deutsche Telekom 14% of the shares. The remaining share is to be in free float. The first day of trading on the Frankfurt Stock Exchange was October 1, 2015. In September 2016, Hellman & Friedman sold its entire stake to Scout24. In June 2018, the Scout24 share was included in the MDAX of the German Stock Exchange. In July 2018, the portal Finanzcheck.de was taken over.

On February 15, 2019, the Scout Group accepted a takeover bid for around 5.7 billion euros from Pulver BidCo GmbH, which is backed by the financial investors Blackstone Group and Hellmann & Friedmann. The takeover fell through when, as of May 14, 2019, only 42.8% of shareholders gave their approval for the takeover, failing to meet the minimum 50% approval rating. The financial investor Blackrock continues to hold a stake in Scout24.

In December 2019 it was announced that Hellmann & Friedman would take over the marketplaces AutoScout24, FinanceScout24 and Finanzcheck from Scout24 for EUR 2.9 billion in the first half of 2020.

Conflicts with other domain owners 
Scout24 International Management AG, based in Switzerland, warned numerous owners of domains with "Scout" in their name and claimed that the sole term "Scout" without the addition "24" was protected by trademark law. However, "Scout" is not registered as a trademark, and at the end of 2012 the World Intellectual Property Organization (WIPO) rejected an application by Scout24 International Management AG directed against owners of similar domains.

External links 

 Website of Scout24

References 

Companies in the MDAX
1998 establishments
Internet technology companies
Deutsche Telekom